Major Distribution may refer to:

 "Major Distribution" (50 Cent song)
 "Major Distribution" (Drake and 21 Savage song)